Soulas is a surname. Notable people with this surname include:

 Dimitris Soulas (born 1938), Greek photojournalist
 Jehan Soulas (died before 1542), French sculptor
 Léonor Jean Christine Soulas d'Allainval ( 1700–1753), French playwright
 Maxime Soulas (born 1999), French football player